Hiltl is a surname. Notable people with the surname include:

Eleonora Hiltl (1905–1979), Austrian politician
Henri Hiltl (1910–1982), Austrian-born French footballer
Hermann Hiltl (1872–1930), Austrian army officer and fascist